Jia Xiaozhong (贾孝忠), born March 1980, is a professional basketball player from China. He is a center and was formerly on the roster of the Shanghai Sharks.

External links
 Jia Xiaozhong at sina.com

1980 births
Living people
Centers (basketball)
Chinese men's basketball players
Shanghai Sharks players
Basketball players from Jiangsu
Place of birth missing (living people)